XEGNAY-AM is a radio station in Tepic, Nayarit, Mexico, owned by the state government of Nayarit. It is branded as Radio Nayarit and broadcasts a public and cultural radio format on 550 AM.

History

XETNC-AM came to air on November 26, 1980. It was the first noncommercial radio station in the state and was long known as Radio Aztlán.

A break in the station's permit history required the station to be reauthorized. As part of the authorization, for which a public use concession was awarded, XETNC became XEGNAY-AM.

In 2021, the state government received a concession for XHTNY-FM, an FM station on 100.3 MHz in Tepic.

External links

References

Public radio in Mexico
Radio stations in Nayarit